Carl Beck-Friis (5 December 1921 – 12 March 2005) was a Swedish sports shooter. He competed in the trap event at the 1960 Summer Olympics.

References

1921 births
2005 deaths
Swedish male sport shooters
Olympic shooters of Sweden
Shooters at the 1960 Summer Olympics
Sport shooters from Stockholm